Hiroaki Matsutani   is a Japanese mixed martial artist. He competed in the Lightweight division.

Mixed martial arts record

|-
| Loss
| align=center| 2-3-2
| Yuki Nakai
| Submission (heel hook)
| Shooto - Vale Tudo Access 3
| 
| align=center| 1
| align=center| 0:20
| Tokyo, Japan
| 
|-
| Win
| align=center| 2-2-2
| Katsuaki Yano
| Decision (unanimous)
| Shooto - Vale Tudo Access 2
| 
| align=center| 3
| align=center| 3:00
| Tokyo, Japan
| 
|-
| Loss
| align=center| 1-2-2
| Suguru Shigeno
| Decision (unanimous)
| Shooto - Shooto
| 
| align=center| 4
| align=center| 3:00
| Tokyo, Japan
| 
|-
| Loss
| align=center| 1-1-2
| Kazuhiro Sakamoto
| Submission (armbar)
| Shooto - Shooto
| 
| align=center| 3
| align=center| 0:00
| Tokyo, Japan
| 
|-
| Win
| align=center| 1-0-2
| Tetsuya Hirada
| Decision (unanimous)
| Shooto - Shooto
| 
| align=center| 3
| align=center| 3:00
| Tokyo, Japan
| 
|-
| Draw
| align=center| 0-0-2
| Tomoyuki Saito
| Draw
| Shooto - Shooto
| 
| align=center| 3
| align=center| 3:00
| Tokyo, Japan
| 
|-
| Draw
| align=center| 0-0-1
| Suguru Shigeno
| Draw
| Shooto - Shooto
| 
| align=center| 3
| align=center| 3:00
| Tokyo, Japan
|

See also
List of male mixed martial artists

References

External links
 
 Hiroaki Matsutani at mixedmartialarts.com

Japanese male mixed martial artists
Lightweight mixed martial artists
Living people
Year of birth missing (living people)